The Storseisundet Bridge is the longest of the eight bridges that make up the Atlanterhavsveien ("The Atlantic Road"), the road connection from the mainland Romsdal peninsula to the island of Averøya in Møre og Romsdal county, Norway.

The bridge sits on the border between Hustadvika Municipality and Averøy Municipality and passes through an archipelago as it links mainland Norway with the island of Averoy. It is one of the country's official national tourist routes.

It was opened on 7 July 1989, and it was a toll road until June 1999.

Over the six years that it took to construct, workers struggled with the region's wild weather and were interrupted by twelve hurricanes. One hundred and twenty-two million Norwegian krone were spent completing the project, seventy-five percent of which came from public grants. The rest of the funding was recovered with toll fees. The bridge was originally projected to recoup its investment in 15 years, but was completely paid for in ten years.

See also
List of bridges in Norway
List of bridges in Norway by length

References

External links

 – official website
Photo of the bridge in a storm

Bridges completed in 1989
Cantilever bridges
Road bridges in Møre og Romsdal
Hustadvika (municipality)
Averøy
1989 establishments in Norway
Norwegian County Road 64
Former toll bridges in Norway